Anibare is a district in the island nation Nauru, a part of the Anabar Constituency.  It is Nauru's largest district in area, and  the smallest in population.

Geography
It has a population of about 250. Nauru's reputation for being densely populated is thus somewhat nuanced, since it refers principally to the average areas and populations of districts other than Anibare.

Local features
 Anibare Bay. A beach with white coral sand near the Menen Hotel which is considered the best place on the island to surf or to swim. It also contains the Anibare Harbor, an artificial commercial fishing area.
 A Phosphate stockpile is located in western Anibare.

See also
 Geography of Nauru
 List of settlements in Nauru
 Rail transport in Nauru

References

External links

Districts of Nauru
Populated places in Nauru